Yengi Kand (also Romanized as Yengī Kand; also known as Deh Now-e Asadollāh Khān (Persian: ده نواسداله خان), Deh Now-e Asdollāh Khān, and Deh Now-ye Asdollāh Khān) is a village in Tork-e Gharbi Rural District, Jowkar District, Malayer County, Hamadan Province, Iran. At the 2006 census, its population was 2,057, in 507 families.

References 

Populated places in Malayer County